The 1964 United States men's Olympic basketball team represented the United States at the 1964 Summer Olympics in Tokyo, Japan. Entering into the Olympics for the sixth time, the United States men's team had won its last 37 games in a row. In the gold medal game, the USA faced the USSR; they were two undefeated teams that were both favorites to win the gold medal. USA won the gold medal for the sixth Olympics in a row, by beating the USSR, 73–59.

Roster

The 1964 United States Olympic basketball team featured college and AAU players. Jerry Shipp led the team with an average of 12.4 points per game.

Results
 beat , 78–45
 beat , 77–51
 beat , 60–45
 beat , 83–28
 beat , 69–61
 beat , 86–53
 beat , 116–50 
 beat , 62–42 (semifinals)
 beat , 73–59 (gold-medal game)

1964 Olympic standings
1.  (9–0)
2.  (8–1)
3.  (6–3)
4.  (5–4)
5.  (6–3)
6.  (5–4)
7.  (6–3)
8.  (4–5)
9.  (4–5)
10.  (4–5)
11.  (4–5)
12.  (3–6)
13.  (4–5)
14.  (1–8)
15.  (3–6)
16.  (0–9)

References

External links
 USA Basketball, official site

United States at the Olympic men's basketball tournament
United States
olympic